Jules Horrent (11 April 1920 – 11 September 1981) was a Belgian medievalist, who was awarded the Francqui Prize in 1968 on Human Sciences for his historical work He worked in Romance studies, Hispanic studies, Italian studies, and Portuguese studies.

References

Belgian medievalists
1920 births
1981 deaths